Chameleon is a 2008 Hungarian comedy film directed by Krisztina Goda. The film was submitted to the 81st Academy Award for Best Foreign Language Films.

Cast 
 Ervin Nagy as Farkas Gábor
 Gabriella Hámori as Hartay Hanna
 János Kulka as Dr. Marton Ferenc
 Sándor Csányi as Torsa Márk

References

External links 

2008 comedy films
2008 films
Hungarian comedy films
Films directed by Krisztina Goda